Three male athletes from Oman competed at the 1996 Summer Paralympics in Atlanta, United States.

See also
Oman at the Paralympics
Oman at the 1996 Summer Olympics

References 

Nations at the 1996 Summer Paralympics
1996
Summer Paralympics